Caransebeș is a city in Caraș-Severin County, part of the Banat region in southwestern Romania. It is located at the confluence of the River Timiș with the River Sebeș, the latter coming from the Țarcu Mountains. To the west, it is in direct contact with the Banat Hills. It is an important railroad node, being located approximately 40 km away from Reșița, 21 km from Oțelu Roșu, 70 km from Hațeg and about 25 km from the Muntele Mic ski resort, in the Țarcu Mountains.

One village, Jupa, is administered by the city.

Climate
Caransebeș has a humid continental climate (Cfb in the Köppen climate classification). It is rather mild. Sub-Mediterranean climatic influences are present to some extent. Temperatures do not drop too low in winter (with an average of 0,-15 °C), but summers can be warm (30-38 °C average). Rainfall can be quite abundant throughout the year.

History 

The first traces of habitation here might date as far as Dacian times. Dacian ruins have been discovered recently near Obreja, a village 7 km away. As the Romans invaded Dacia, they built a castrum named Tibiscum, which was dug up by archaeologists near the nearby village of Jupa, a castrum which later grew to be a full city. Tibiscum is considered one of the gates of Christianity in Dacia, having an important role also in the Romanization of the local people.

During the Middle Ages, the local people continuously inhabited the area. The region became part of the Hungarian Kingdom, then later under the rule of the Transylvanian Principality, and under the rule of the Ottoman Empire. In 1788 a self-inflicted defeat, the Battle of Caransebeș, is supposed (the historical accuracy is in doubt) to have taken place here. Later, the Habsburgs took the control of the region, after prolonged wars against the Ottomans. As part of the Principality of Transylvania, in 1804 it became part of the Austrian Empire. After the Austro-Hungarian Compromise of 1867, it became again part of Hungary.

After railroads began to appear, the role of Caransebeș grew continuously. In the late 19th century, the Romanian people of the settlement elected to the Parliament of Hungary the Hungarian Lajos Mocsáry, who was a progressive democratic politician fighting for the cultural and administrative rights of all nationalities (including the Romanians) living in the Hungarian Kingdom of that time.

In late October 1918, near the close of World War I, a Romanian National Committee was established in Caransebeș. It formed the core of the largest Banat delegation to Alba Iulia, where the union of Transylvania with Romania was proclaimed on December 1. Meanwhile, the entire Banat was occupied by the Serbian Army following the Armistice of Belgrade. The Serbs withdrew from the Caransebeș area in January 1919, and were replaced by the French Army. Romania began administering the Banat in late July, with troops moving in during the following weeks. In August 1919, during the Paris Peace Conference, the Banat was divided between the Kingdom of Serbs, Croats and Slovenes and Greater Romania, with Caransebeș assigned to the latter.

After the rise of the communist regime in 1947, an airport and an airbase were built close to the city. However, the airport did not remain operational for long after the 1989 Revolution.

Education
The city's two leading high schools are the C. D. Loga National College and the Traian Doda National College.

Demographics

As of 2011 Caransebeș had a population of 21,932, mainly Romanians (93.48%), with Ukrainian (1.56%), German (1.17%), and Hungarian (0.78%) minorities present, but in decline.

Notable people 
 Dan Alexa, football player
 Lucian Buzan, football player
 Nicolae Corneanu, Orthodox metropolitan bishop
 Corneliu Dragalina, Romanian World War II general
 Ion Dragalina, Romanian World War I general
 René Fülöp-Miller, Austrian cultural historian and writer
 Sorin Grindeanu, politician, Prime Minister of Romania
 Emanoil Ionescu, Romanian World War II general
 Damian Isac, football player
 Gustav Jaumann, Austrian physicist (1863–1924)
 Wilhelm Klein, archaeologist
 Patricia Maria Țig, tennis player

References

External links 

  Official Website of the Caransebeș City Hall
  Unofficial website about Caransebeș
  Banaterra - Information about the Caransebeș Region

Populated places in Caraș-Severin County
Cities in Romania
Mining communities in Romania
Localities in Romanian Banat